A military exercise, training exercise, or war game is the employment of military resources in training for military operations. Military exercises are conducted to explore the effects of warfare or test tactics and strategies without actual combat. They also ensure the combat readiness of garrisoned or deployable forces prior to deployment from a home base.

While both war games and military exercises aim to simulate real conditions and scenarios for the purpose of preparing and analyzing those scenarios, the distinction between a war game and a military exercise is determined, primarily, by the involvement of actual military forces within the simulation, or lack thereof. Military exercises focus on the simulation of real, full-scale military operations in controlled hostile conditions in attempts to reproduce war time decisions and activities for training purposes or to analyze the outcome of possible war time decisions. War games, however, can be much smaller than full-scale military operations, do not typically include the use of functional military equipment, and decisions and actions are carried out by artificial players to simulate possible decisions and actions within an artificial scenario which usually represents a model of a real-world scenario. Additionally, mathematical modeling is used in the simulation of war games to provide a quantifiable method of deduction. However, it is rare that a war game is depended upon for quantitative results, and the use of war games is more often found in situations where qualitative factors of the simulated scenario are needed to be determined.

The actual use of war games and the results that they can provide are limited by possibilities. War games cannot be used to achieve predictive results, as the nature of war and the scenarios that war games aim to simulate are not deterministic. Therefore, war games are primarily used to consider multiple possible outcomes of any given decision, or number of decisions, made in the simulated scenario. These possible outcomes are analyzed and compared, and cause-and-effect relationships are typically sought for the unknown factors within the simulation. It is typically the relationships between visual aspects of the simulation that aid in the assessment of the problems that are simulated within war games, like geographic locations and positionings that would be difficult to discern or analyze at full-scale and for complex environments.

Military exercises involving multiple branches of the same military are known as joint exercises, while military exercises involving two or more countries are known as combined, coalition, bilateral, or multilateral exercises, depending on the nature of the relationship between the countries and the number of them involved. These exercises allow for better coordination between militaries and observation of enemy tactics, and serve as a visible show of strength and cooperation for the participating countries. According to a 2021 study, joint military exercises within well-defined alliances usually deter adversaries without producing a moral hazard because of the narrow scope of the alliance, while joint military exercises outside of an alliance (which are extremely rare) usually lead to conflict escalation.

Exercises in the 20th and 21st centuries have often been identified by a unique code name, such as Cobra Gold, in the same manner as military contingency operations and combat operations like Operation Phantom Fury.

Military exercises are sometimes used as cover for the build up to an actual invasion, as in the cases of the Warsaw Pact invasion of Czechoslovakia and the 2022 Russian invasion of Ukraine, or it can provoke opponents at peace to perceive it as such, as in the case of Able Archer 83.

Types

Command post

A Command Post Exercise (CPX) typically focuses on the battle readiness of staffs such as a particular Unified Combatant Command or one of its components at any level. It may run in parallel with an FTX or its equivalent, or as a stand-alone event for headquarters staff only with heavy emphasis on simulated events.

Field

Historical names for the field exercise, or the full-scale rehearsal of military maneuvers as practice for warfare in the military services of the British Commonwealth include "schemes," while those of the military services United States are known as Field Training Exercises (FTX), or, in the case of naval forces, Fleet Exercises (FLEETEX). In a field exercise or fleet exercise, the two sides in the simulated battle are typically called "red" (simulating the enemy forces) and "blue", to avoid naming a particular adversary.  This naming convention originates with the inventors of the table-top war-game (the "Kriegsspiel"), the Prussian Georg von Reisswitz; their army wore Prussian blue, so friendly forces were depicted by the color blue.

Multiple forces

Several different armed forces of the same nation training together are described as having a joint exercise. Those involving forces of multiple nations are described as having a combined exercise or coalition exercise. These are called a bilateral exercise if based on security agreements between two nations, or a multilateral exercise if the agreement is between multiple nations.

Simulation

Other types of exercise include the Tactical Exercise Without Troops (TEWT), also known as a sand table, map, cloth model, or computer simulation exercise. These allow commanders to manipulate models through possible scenarios in military planning. This is also called warfare simulation, or in some instances a virtual battlefield, and in the past has been described as "wargames". Such examples of modern military wargames include DARWARS, a serious game developed since 2003 by DARPA with BBN Technologies, a defense contractor which was involved in the development of packet switching, used for ARPANET, and which developed the first computer modem in 1963.

Military operations and training have included different scenarios a soldier might encounter with morals and different ethics. In one military operation soldiers are frequently asked to engage in combat, humanitarian, and stabilization roles. These increase the ambiguity of a role one may encounter and challenge of ethics. This will also lead the military personnel to have to make a difficult call in challenging circumstances. Even in difficult situations and conditions, military personnel still has to follow rules and regulations such as: 1) when the right thing to do is not immediately clear; 2) when two or more important principles or values support different actions, and 3) when some harm will result, regardless of the actions taken (Defense Ethics Program, Department of National Defense, 2012). These simulations involve crude living conditions, sleep deprivations, time limit, and either lack or ambiguous amount of information.

A subset of simulated exercises is the Table Top Exercise (TTX), typically limited to senior personnel stepping through the decision-making processes they would employ in a crisis, a contingency, or general warfare.

History

The use of military exercises and war games can be found to date back to as early as the early 19th century, wherein it was the officers of the Prussian Army who created the contemporary, tactical form of wargames that have since been more widely used and developed by other military conglomerations throughout the world. Non-tactical forms of wargames have existed for much longer, however, in the forms of tabletop games such as chess and Go.

The modern use of military exercises grew out of the military need to study warfare and to reenact old battles for learning purposes. During the age of Kabinettskriege (Cabinet wars), Frederick the Great, King of Prussia from 1740 to 1786, "put together his armies as a well-oiled clockwork mechanism whose components were robot-like warriors. No individual initiative was allowed to Frederick's soldiers; their only role was to cooperate in the creation of walls of projectiles through synchronized firepower." This was in the pursuit of a more effective army, and such practices made it easier to look at war from a top-down perspective. Disciplined troops should respond predictably, allowing study to be confined to maneuvers and command.

Prussia's victory over the Second French Empire in the Franco-Prussian War (1870–71) is sometimes partly credited to the training of Prussian officers with the wargame Kriegsspiel, which was invented around 1811 and gained popularity with many officers in the Prussian army. These first wargames were played with dice which represented "friction", or the intrusion of less than ideal circumstances during a real war (including morale, meteorology, the fog of war, etc.).

21st century militaries still use wargames to simulate future wars and model their reaction. According to Manuel de Landa, after World War II the Command, Control and Communications (C3) was transferred from the military staff to the RAND Corporation, the first think tank. Around the mid to late 20th century, computer simulated war games were created to replace traditional war gaming methods with the goal of optimizing and speeding up the process and making it possible to analyze more complex scenarios with greater ease. In 1958, the Naval War college installed a computer war game system where their traditional war gaming activities were held. The system was called the Navy Electronic Warfare System, and cost over $10 million to install. The change from traditional war gaming methods to electronic computer simulated ones meant that the value and accuracy of a war game simulation was less dependent on skill and individual experiences, and more dependent on quantitative data and complicated analysis methods.

Von Neumann was employed by the RAND Corporation, and his game theory was used in wargames to model nuclear dissuasion during the Cold War. Thus, the U.S. nuclear strategy was defined using wargames, "SAM" representing the U.S. and "IVAN" representing the Soviet Union.

Early game theory included only zero-sum games, which means that when one player won, the other automatically lost. The prisoner's dilemma, which models the situation of two prisoners in which each one is given the choice to betray or not the other, gave three alternatives to the game:
Neither prisoners betrays the other, and both are given short-term sentences
One prisoner betrays the other, and is freed, while the other gets a long sentence
Both prisoners betray each other, and both are given mid-sized sentences

This model gave the basis for the massive retaliation nuclear doctrine. The zero-sum fallacy and cooperative games would be theorized only later, while the evolution of nuclear technology and missiles made the massive retaliation nuclear strategy obsolete.

List of military exercises

Current and recurring

Former, significant

See also

Aggressor squadron 
Maneuver warfare
Flanking maneuver
Live fire exercise
Pincer movement
Simulation

References

External links
 Complete 911 Timeline: Center for Cooperative Research—Military exercises up to 9/11